Simlepiggen is a mountain in Sel Municipality in Innlandet county, Norway. The mountain is surrounded by several other notable mountains including Hornflågene to the southeast, Veslsvulten and Rondvasshøgde to the northeast, Storronden and Vinjeronden to the north, and Svartnuten to the northwest.

See also
List of mountains of Norway by height

References

Sel
Mountains of Innlandet